Sugar Labs is a community-run software project whose mission is to produce, distribute, and support the use of Sugar, an open source desktop environment and learning platform. Sugar Labs was initially established as a member project of the Software Freedom Conservancy, an umbrella organization for free software (FLOSS) projects., but in 2021, it became an independent 501(c)(3) organization.

About every six months, the Sugar Labs community releases a new version of the Sugar software. The most recent stable release is available as a Fedora Linux spin. Through on-going support from Nexcopy's RecycleUSB program, Sugar Labs provides Sugar on a Stick to elementary schools.

The Sugar Labs community participates in events for teachers, students, and software developers interested in the Sugar software, such as the Montevideo Youth Summit and Turtle Art Day.

Sugar Labs had participated in Google Code-in, which served as an outlet for young programmers. Sugar Labs is a long-time participant in Google Summer of Code.

References

External links

 Sugar Labs homepage

2008 establishments in Massachusetts
Free software companies
One Laptop per Child
Organizations established in 2008